This is a list of flatiron buildings that are relatively notable.  "Flatiron Building" is a name applied to a number of buildings shaped like a flatiron. One of the most famous is the Flatiron Building in New York City, which was finished in 1902. The name "Flatiron Building" may refer to many of the buildings listed below.

Locations of all having coordinates below may be seen on a map by clicking "Map all coordinates using OpenStreetMap" at the right side of this page.

Australia
 Sydney Dental Hospital, Sydney, 1940. Streamline Moderne.

Canada

At one time there were only ten flatiron buildings in Canada, with six within Ontario. Moses Block, a historic site in Sudbury was completed sometime between 1907 and 1915 by Hascal Moses and the Moses Family. The design of the flatiron building was inspired by the famous Flatiron Building in New York City.

China
 Wukang Mansion, aka Normandie Apartments, Shanghai, 1924, 1836–1858 Middle Huaihai Road, Xuhui District [ Compare: Normandie Hotel. ]

Croatia
Pegla (Zadar, Croatia)

Finland

Germany
 Bügeleisenhaus (Hattingen, Germany), a timber-framed house, now a museum, in Hattingen, Germany

Hungary
 (Hungarian for "Flatiron Building"), (1913), 8 Takaréktár Street - 9 Horváth Mihály Street, Szeged, designed by Lipót Baumhorn (1860–1932)

Israel
 (Hebrew for "Ship Building"), Tel Aviv, Israel, 1935

Netherlands
 Het Strijkijzer (Dutch for "The Iron"), The Hague, 2007, Rijswijkseplein 400

North Macedonia
Adora Flatiron, Skopje, North Macedonia, 2017

Portugal
 Avenida da Liberdade, 155, Lisbon

Slovenia
Peglezen, Ljubljana, 1925 or 1932-34?, 2009 NSDP, Poljanska cesta 1

Spain
 Casa Antònia Serra i Mas, Barcelona

Sweden
 Flat Iron Building (Stockholm), Sweden, 2009, LEEDS certified.

United Kingdom
 Imperial Buildings (Liverpool), Liverpool, 1879

United States

KEY

See also
Flatiron (disambiguation)
Flatiron District, Manhattan

Notes

References

External links

Lists of places sharing the same name
Flatiron Building